Remnant Media was a British company which published a variety of pornographic magazines.

On 1 March 2004, Richard Desmond's company Northern and Shell sold a package of 45 titles, for about £20m, to Remnant Media in order to help reshape Desmond's image as part of his strategy to bid for The Daily Telegraph. The Bank of Scotland became embroiled in controversy by lending Remnant Media £5 million towards the financing package.

Overview
The company's best known title was Asian Babes magazine. Other magazines published under its Fantasy Publications brand included Readers Wives, Horny Housewives, Mega Boobs, Mothers-in-Law, Big Ones, Just 18 and 60 Plus. Remnant Media also published the gay lifestyle magazine attitude until January 2007.

Administration 
Remnant Media entered administration in late 2007. The assets of the company were soon sold to Trojan Publishing, itself soon acquired by Interactive Publishing. Trojan went into liquidation from 2010 and was dissolved by May 2013. 

In December 2005, Remnant Media created an offshoot publishing company SMD Publishing which was dissolved in July 2010. Publications under SMD included Hotdog magazine and Front magazine.

References

External links
Adult Sex Toys
Silicone Love Doll

Adult magazine publishing companies
Defunct companies of the United Kingdom
Companies with year of establishment missing
Companies disestablished in 2007